Sebastián Vidal (born 18 April 1989, in Argentina) is an Argentine retired footballer.

Career

After failing to make an appearance for Boca Juniors, Vidal played for Club Atlético Temperley, Estudiantes de Buenos Aires, as well as CA Excursionistas in the Argentine lower leagues.

At the age of 31, he retired to become sports secretary of Avellaneda.

References

External links
 

Argentine footballers
Living people
Association football midfielders
Unión de Santa Fe footballers
Club Atlético Temperley footballers
Club Atlético Patronato footballers
Estudiantes de Buenos Aires footballers
CA Excursionistas players
Sportivo Dock Sud players
Comisión de Actividades Infantiles footballers
1989 births
Boca Juniors footballers